Out of True is the fourth studio album by British band The Nightingales. Released in the United Kingdom on 2 October 2006, the album is the band's first since 1986's In The Good Old Country Way. The album was recorded  in June 2006 in Birmingham.  The album contains 3 cover versions, "Let's Think About Living" by Bob Luman, "Good Boy" by Kevin Coyne and "There's A New World Just Opening For Me" by Ray Davies. The song "Good Boy" had previously been covered by frontman, Robert Lloyd, for a John Peel Session in 1990. The rest of the tracks on the album were written by Robert Lloyd with various members of the past and present lineups of The Nightingales.

Track listing 
 "Born Again in Birmingham" – 4:38
 "The Chorus Is The Title" – 4:00
 "Carry On Up The Ante" – 3:08
 "Hard Up (Buffering 87% Completed)" – 5:26
 "Taking Away the Stigma of Free School Dinners" – 7:33
 "Company Man" – 2:03
 "UK Randy Mom Epidemic" – 3:19
 "Fifty Fifty" – 5:46
 "Let's Think About Living" – 2:30
 "Black Country" – 6:16
 "Good Boy" – 3:19
 "Workshy Wunderkind" – 3:32
 "Rocket Pool via Rough Hills" – 5:58
 "There's a New World Just Opening for Me" – 4:23

Personnel 
 Robert Lloyd – Lead Vocals
 Alan Apperley – Guitars, Vocals
 Daren Garratt – Drums, Percussion
 Matt Wood – Guitars, Vocals
 Ste Lowe – Bass
 Gina Birch – Lead Vocals on "Black Country"
 Poppy and The Jezebels – Vocals on "Carry On Up The Ante"
 Brett Richardson – Bassoon
 Bob Lamb – Drums, Vocals
 Stewart Brackley – Double Bass

Richardson, Lamb, and Brackley only appear on certain tracks.

Reception 
Jennifer Kelly of PopMatters called the album "brash, sardonic, and wonderful".

Ben Thompson of The Daily Telegraph wrote "This is that rarest of achievements: a comeback album that actually adds to an
already illustrious reputation. ... Out of True finds the
Nightingales not merely back to their best, but actually improved."

References

External links 
Official artist website

2006 albums
The Nightingales albums
Alternative rock albums by British artists